Pindobind is a compound developed by researchers associated with Stanford University, identified as a central nervous system depressant, which generated a response in animals reducing offensive actions such as chasing, while also notably reducing tendencies of the test animal to evade when stimulated to do so. It acts as an irreversible beta blocker and irreversible 5-HT1A receptor antagonist.

See also
 Pindolol
 Phenoxybenzamine

References

5-HT1A antagonists
Beta blockers
Indole ethers at the benzene ring
Irreversible antagonists
Alkylating agents
Acetamides
Organobromides
N-tert-butyl-phenoxypropanolamines